P. aureus  may refer to:
 Paradoxurus aureus, the golden wet-zone palm civet, a carnivore endemic to Sri Lanka.
 Pipanacoctomys aureus, the golden Vizcacha rat, a rodent species only known from Catamarca Province of northwestern Argentina
 Plectrurus aureus, the Kerala shieldtail, a snake species found in the Western Ghats
 Poecilmitis aureus, a butterfly species endemic to South Africa
 Pseudochromis aureus, the brown dottyback or yellow pseudochromis, a wide-ranging saltwater fish from the Indo-Pacific

Synonyms
 Paraphydippus aureus, a synonym for Paraphidippus aurantius, a jumping spider species
 Phaseolus aureus, the former name of Vigna radiata, the mung bean, a plant species

See also
 Aureus (disambiguation)